The ITF Roller Open was a tournament for professional female tennis players played on outdoor clay courts. The event was classified as a $100,000 ITF Women's Circuit tournament. It was held annually in Pétange, Luxembourg, from 2001 to 2011.

Past finals

Singles

Doubles

External links 
 Official website 
 ITF search 

 
ITF Women's World Tennis Tour
Clay court tennis tournaments
Tennis tournaments in Luxembourg
Recurring sporting events established in 2001
Recurring sporting events disestablished in 2011
Defunct sports competitions in Luxembourg